Nicholas William Bailey (born December 21, 1980) is an American composer and songwriter from New Bern, North Carolina. Bailey composes for a variety of cable television networks including TLC, A&E, Animal Planet, The National Geographic Channel, E! Entertainment, CMT, OWN TV, Travel Channel, Speed, MSNBC, ABC, SyFy, CNBC, Tru TV, Discovery and VH1. Bailey is an active ASCAP composer and publisher. Bailey is also a member of the rock band "Nick and the Babes," and produces reality based television programming.

Career
Upon graduating from East Carolina University in 2003 Bailey accepted residency as a piano bar musician. In 2008 Bailey was given the opportunity to compose for TLC's 18 Kids and Counting by fellow North Carolina musician Scott Pearson. Bailey landed music cues into the TLC series. Post composing contributions include Crime 360, The Last American Cowboy, Known Universe, Lockup, Pit Bulls and Parolees, What's Eating You, Lizard Lick Touring, My Deadly Appetite, Searching For, Make Me Superhuman, Car Warriors, Police POV, Fact or Faked, Joe Rogan Questions Everything, Shark Shoot: Fiji, Legend Quest, Breaking Down the Bars, Full Throttle Saloon, In The Bedroom with Dr. Laura Berman, Car Chasers, Abby & Brittany, Swanderosa, Chainsaw Gangs, Duck Dynasty, My Cat From Hell, and Dad Camp. Bailey has scored over 700 cable television episodes and produced programming for PBS, TRU TV, UKTV and HGTV.

Bailey's film/commercial music contributions include The Editor and the Dragon (narrated by Morgan Freeman), Intel/Lenovo, an award-winning Dale Earnhardt Jr./Taxslayer advert, corporate media, Newsweek.com's acclaimed webseries The District and the defunct virtual gaming world Zookazoo.

Bailey along with members of "Nick and the Babes" appeared on Ramseur Records' 2011 release "My Favorite Gifts" Christmas album along with The Avett Brothers. Bob Crawford (Avett Brothers) produced their rendition of Vince Guaraldi's "Christmas Time is Here." "Nick and the Babes" often referred to as NATB is an Americana/Indie Rock band based out of Raleigh, North Carolina.

References

External links
 

American male composers
21st-century American composers
1980 births
Living people
East Carolina University alumni
People from New Bern, North Carolina
Musicians from North Carolina
21st-century American male musicians